Alice Harpur may refer to:

Dame Alice Harpur School
Alice More Harpur, wife of Thomas More